Ambala  is a village in Barisal District in the Barisal Division of southern-central Bangladesh.

See also

References

External links
Satellite map at Maplandia.com

Populated places in Barisal District